Hands All Over may refer to:

 Hands All Over (album), by Maroon 5
 "Hands All Over", the title track from the album
 "Hands All Over" (Soundgarden song)

id:Hands All Over